Mike "Loose" Peluso (born September 2, 1974) is an American former professional ice hockey right winger who played 38 games in the National Hockey League (NHL) for the Chicago Blackhawks and Philadelphia Flyers.

Playing career
He was drafted by the Calgary Flames in the 10th round of the 1994 NHL Entry Draft. He spent a majority of his career in the minor leagues, although he did see short amounts of time in the NHL with the Chicago Blackhawks and Philadelphia Flyers. Along with many call up's to the NHL Mike was forced into retirement due to injuries Other notable hockey accomplishments: Mike is a top 20 all time scorer in points and a top 10 all time goal scorer at the University of Minnesota Duluth. Mike also holds the North Dakota High School hockey single season scoring record with 99 points in 23 games during the old 15 minute period era. 

Peluso represented Team USA at the World Championships in Russia in 2000. Along with playing in the World Championship he represented Team USA in numerous other select teams over his career. He was also a 4 time AHL All Star selection, and USHL All Star 2 times winning the hardest shot competition both years registering shots close to 100 mph.

He retired after the 2003–04 NHL season. NHL lockout and injuries were reason for retirement. Mike had offers to play overseas and also to become a player coach in the AHL that lockout year, but chose to return to Bismarck. 

Mike went on to coaching back in ND after retirement. 4 seasons as an assistant coach with NAHL Bismarck Bobcats and a 11 seasons as the Head Coach of the Bismarck High Demons. The Demons won their first State Title under Peluso in 2014. They were also State Runners up 5 other times under Mikes guidance and WDA Tournament Champions 6 times. Lots of Mikes former players went on to play high level juniors and Division I College.

Personal life
Peluso is the younger cousin of Stanley Cup champion Mike Peluso, who also played for Chicago. A lot of Peluso's family members played at high levels. His uncle Tom was an All-American at the University of Denver and played professionally. His father Jim played at Denver for four years. His cousin Marco Peluso played at Minnesota-Duluth and went onto professional ice hockey. Two other cousins Chris Peluso and Molly Arola played at Bemidji State University. Two other distant cousins played for the Minnesota Golden Gophers. 

As a head hockey coach at Bismarck High School, Mike coached the team to their first ever state title. He coached BHS for 11 seasons bringing them to the state title game 6 times.

Awards and honors

 
 Inducted into the North Dakota Sports Hall of Fame 2020
 Holds the North Dakota high school single-season scoring record with 99 points in 23 games.
 First Bismarck native to play in any of the four major North American sports leagues.

References

External links
 

1974 births
Living people
American men's ice hockey right wingers
Calgary Flames draft picks
Chicago Blackhawks players
Ice hockey people from North Dakota
Minnesota Duluth Bulldogs men's ice hockey players
Norfolk Admirals players
Omaha Lancers players
Philadelphia Flyers players
Philadelphia Phantoms players
Portland Pirates players
Sportspeople from Bismarck, North Dakota
Worcester IceCats players